Events from the Year 1983 in England

Incumbent

Events

January

February

March

April

May

June

July

August

September

October

November

December

Births
23 August - Fiona Onasanya, Labour politician and convicted criminal

Deaths

See also
1983 in Northern Ireland
1983 in Scotland
1983 in Wales

References

 
England
Years of the 20th century in England
1980s in England